Hans Andre (born 1950 in Stockholm), is a Swedish artist with a focus on social and political issues.

Andre received two years of project grants from the Swedish Royal Academy of Fine Arts to develop graphic and photographic art. In the 70's he worked together with Staffan Hallström, resulting in a 16 mm film about the Paris Metro. Then followed exhibitions at the Gallery Prisma and Ljungsjögården, galleries owned by  Leif Nielsen.

Over the years, Andre turned to painting. Besides numerous exhibitions in Sweden, he exhibited his works in Milan, Italy and Berlin, Germany.

References

Contemporary painters
1950 births
Living people